Willem Adriaan Odendaal (born 11 July 1990 in Pretoria, South Africa) is a South African rugby union player, who most recently played with the . He can play as a scrum-half, centre or winger.

Career

Youth

Odendaal played school rugby for Hoërskool Eldoraigne and earned a selection to the  squad for the Under-18 Craven Week in 2008. He played for the  team in the 2008 and 2009 Under-19 Provincial Championships.

Falcons

He made eight appearances in the competition and playing mainly as a scrum-half. Six starts and two appearances off the bench followed in his second Currie Cup campaign in 2011, contributing one try.

From 2012, Odendaal played mainly as a centre. He scored three tries, but could not help the Falcons finish higher than second-last in the competition. After a further seven appearances in the 2013 Vodacom Cup, he had his most prolific Currie Cup season for the Falcons, scoring seven tries in eleven appearances. He topped the try-scoring charts for the Falcons and finished ninth overall.

References

South African rugby union players
Living people
1990 births
Rugby union players from Pretoria
Rugby union scrum-halves
Rugby union centres
Rugby union wings
Falcons (rugby union) players